Chosen by Molecular Biology of the Cell Associate Editors, the MBoC Paper of the Year is awarded to the first author of the paper judged to be the best of the year in the field of molecular biology, from June to May.

Awardees
Source: MBoC

See also

 List of biology awards

References

American Society for Cell Biology
Biology awards
American science and technology awards
Awards established in 1991
1991 establishments in the United States